Raluca Olaru and Olga Savchuk were the defending champions, but lost in the quarterfinals to Veronika Kudermetova and Aryna Sabalenka.

Elise Mertens and Demi Schuurs won the title, defeating Lyudmyla Kichenok and Makoto Ninomiya in the final, 6–2, 6–2.

Seeds

Draw

Draw

References
Draw

Hobart International - Doubles
Doubles